The Body Disappears is a 1941 American comedy film directed by D. Ross Lederman and starring Jeffrey Lynn and Jane Wyman.

Plot
Unconscious after his bachelor party, Peter De Haven (Jeffrey Lynn) is transported by his friends to the college dissecting room as a practical joke. Professor Shotesbury (Edward Everett Horton) mistakenly injects him with a serum that makes him invisible. While invisible, De Haven learns that his fiancee, Christine (Marguerite Chapman), is only marrying him for his money. He also falls in love with Shotesbury's daughter, Joan (Jane Wyman). Meanwhile, Shotesbury is committed to a sanitarium by his colleagues for his claims about invisible monkeys and men. De Haven and Joan, by this time also invisible, go to release Shotesbury from the mental hospital, which they achieve by making him invisible as well. All the while time is running out for De Haven to receive an antidote. In the end, all receive the antidote, and De Haven ends up with Joan.

Cast
 Jeffrey Lynn as Peter De Haven III
 Jane Wyman as Joan Shotesbury
 Edward Everett Horton as Professor Shotesbury
 Herbert Anderson as George "Doc" Appleby
 Marguerite Chapman as Christine Lunceford
 Craig Stevens as Robert Struck
 David Bruce as Jimmie Barbour
 Willie Best as Willie
 Ivan F. Simpson as Dean Claxton (as Ivan Simpson)
 Tod Andrews as Bill (as Michael Ames)
 William Hopper as Terrence Abbott (as DeWolf Hopper)
 Natalie Schafer as Mrs. Lunceford
 Charles Halton as Prof. Moggs
 Sidney Bracey as Barrett (as Sidney Bracy)
 Wade Boteler as Inspector Deming

References

External links
 

1941 films
1941 comedy films
American comedy films
1940s English-language films
American black-and-white films
Films directed by D. Ross Lederman
1940s American films